Jennifer Sheridan Moss is an American papyrologist at Wayne State University and president of the American Society of Papyrologists for 2015–17.

See also
Roger S. Bagnall

References

External links 
http://www.livescience.com/49495-x-ray-reading-herculaneum-scrolls.html
http://www.freep.com/story/news/local/michigan/2014/11/08/rising-college-costs-worry-michigan/18655599/

Living people
Wayne State University faculty
American papyrologists
Year of birth missing (living people)